The Minister charged with the administration of The Manitoba Public Insurance Corporation Act is a minister in the Executive Council of Manitoba, Canada, appointed by the Lieutenant Governor in Council pursuant to the Act.  The chairman of the corporation reports to the appointed minister.  The position is not a full portfolio, and all ministers who have held the position have also held other cabinet responsibilities.

List of Ministers charged with the administration of The Manitoba Public Insurance Corporation Act

Sources:  ,

References

Manitoba Public Insurance Corporation Act, Minister charged with the administration of The